Melvin "Mel" Goodes is a Canadian businessman.

He is a graduate of Queen's University at Kingston, receiving his Bachelor of Commerce in 1957. In recent years, he has been an active member of the board of trustees and a benefactor of the university. Goodes donated a large amount toward the construction of a new home for the Queen's School of Business, which is named Goodes Hall in honor of his parents, Mary and Cedric Goodes. He holds an MBA from the University of Chicago Graduate School of Business.

Goodes was the chief operating officer and president of Warner-Lambert Company from 1985 to 1991. He retired from his position as chairman and CEO of Warner-Lambert in 1999. During his tenure, he received the Drucker award for his "dramatic turnaround of the global pharmaceutical and consumer products company".

Since 1994, Goodes was a director of Ameritech Corporation and was a member of the finance committee, the executive committee and the chairman for the nominating committee. In 1987, Goodes was a director for Unisys Corporation and a member of its corporate governance and compensation committee until he retired in February 2004.

References

Canadian businesspeople
Year of birth missing (living people)
Queen's University at Kingston alumni
Canadian philanthropists
University of Chicago Booth School of Business alumni
Living people